Reem Sameer Shaikh is an Indian actress, known for her works in Indian television and Hindi cinema. Her most notable work includes Na Bole Tum Na Maine Kuch Kaha, Chakravartin Ashoka Samrat, Tujhse Hai Raabta, Gul Makai and Fanaa: Ishq Mein Marjawan.

Life and career
Reem Sameer Shaikh was born on 8 September in Mumbai, Maharashtra.

Shaikh started her career as a child actor at the age of 6 with Neer Bhare Tere Naina Devi. In 2012, she starred in Me Aajji Aur Sahib and Yeh Rishta Kya Kehlata Hai.

She was later seen in the show Na Bole Tum Na Maine Kuch Kaha as Rimjhim Bhatnagar. She was also seen as Khushboo in Khelti Hai Zindagi Aankh Micholi. and as Mishri in the show Diya Aur Baati Hum. She gained popularity with her portrayal of young Kaurwaki, the wife of Emperor Ashoka in the show Chakravartin Ashoka Samrat opposite Siddharth Nigam.

In 2018, she guest-starred as Sanaya Seth on Colors TV popular show Tu Aashiqui. In the same year, she booked the lead role of Kalyani Malhar Rane in Zee TV'''s new show Tujhse Hai Raabta and also received the Gold Debut in Lead Role award for the show in 2019.

In 2020, she played Malala Yousafzai in the biopic Gul Makai.

In 2022, Shaikh was seen as Paakhi Srivastava Raichand in Colors TV's Fanaa: Ishq Mein Marjawan opposite Zain Imam and Akshit Sukhija.

Since February 2023, she is seen in Colors TV’s series Tere Ishq Mein Ghayal'' as Eisha Sharma.

Filmography

Films

Television

Special appearances

Web series

Music videos

Awards and nominations

References

External links

 
 

Living people
Actresses from Mumbai
Indian film actresses
Indian television actresses
Actresses in Hindi television
Indian soap opera actresses
Indian television child actresses
Actresses in Hindi cinema
21st-century Indian actresses
Year of birth missing (living people)